Harold Spencer was a footballer.

Harold Spencer may also refer to:

Harold Sherwood Spencer (1890–?), American-born British anti-homosexuality and antisemitic activist
Harold E.P. Spencer, Suffolk geologist employed at Ipswich Museum

See also
Harry Spencer (disambiguation)